Thyene imperialis is a jumping spider species in the genus Thyene.

Distribution
The spider is widely distributed in Southern Europe, North and East Africa, across the Middle East to Central Asia, China, India and Indonesia. It has been observed in Iran and Turkmenistan.

References

Salticidae
Spiders of Africa
Spiders of Asia
Spiders of Europe
Spiders of the Indian subcontinent
Spiders described in 1846
Taxa named by Pietro Rossi